Erik Sergiyovych Sviatchenko (born 4 October 1991) is a Danish footballer who plays as a defender and captain of FC Midtjylland.

Club career

FC Midtjylland
Sviatchenko was, during his youth playing years, captain of the FC Midtjylland squad. During his first year as a U/19 player, he and his team finished first in the Danish  U/19 league, which was followed up the next season with another first place.  In 2009, he was awarded the "Academy Player Of The Year" award, which is given to players who have excelled themselves during their period at the academy.

He has been a starter in almost all of FC Midtjylland's games since his arrival at the club. He missed the Danish Cup final against FC Nordsjælland in May 2011 and the UEFA European Under-21 Championship in Denmark due to a cruciate ligament injury. In January 2012 he recovered and rejoined the first team in FC Midtjylland and played all the games in the last half of the season. Prior to the season 2013/2014 he was made vice-captain of the first team.

Sviatchenko established himself as a key player for FC Midtjylland, helping them to the Danish title in 2014–15, as well as securing progression to the last 32 stage of the UEFA Europa League the following season.

Celtic
On 16 January 2016, it was reported that Sviatchenko was in Glasgow undergoing a medical with a view to joining Celtic in a £1.5 million transfer. The transfer was confirmed the following day, with Sviatchenko signing a four-and-a-half year deal with Celtic. Sviatchenko helped Celtic win a domestic treble in 2016–17. He damaged knee ligaments in a 2017–18 UEFA Champions League qualifier against Rosenborg, which prevented him playing for three months.

Return to FC Midtjylland 
In January 2018, Sviatchenko returned to FC Midtjylland on loan until the end of the 2017–18 season. That loan move was made permanent on 27 May 2018 for a fee of £1m.

International career
Due to his dual citizenship, Sviatchenko was eligible to play for Ukraine, but agreed to a call-up for the Danish national team on 25 March 2015, due to injuries for Daniel Agger and Jores Okore. He made his international debut the following day at NRGi Arena in Aarhus, starting against the United States in a 3–2 friendly win, in central defence alongside Simon Kjær.

Personal life
His wife, Anne Sviatchenko, is a former professional footballer and has played for Team Viborg's women's team, Skovbakken IK, ASA, Celtic FC and the Denmark national team. Rudmose signed for the Celtic women's team in February 2016, one month after Sviatchenko had joined the men's team.

Career statistics

Club

International
Scores and results table. Denmark's goal tally first:

Honours
FC Midtjylland
 Danish Superliga: 2014–15, 2017–18, 2019–20 
 Danish Cup: 2018–19, 2021–22

Celtic
 Scottish Premiership: 2015–16, 2016–17
 Scottish Cup: 2016–17
 Scottish League Cup: 2016–17, 2017–18

Individual
 Tipsbladet Player of the Fall: 2019
 Tipsbladet Player of the Spring: 2020

References

External links
FC Midtjylland profile

National team profile
Official Danish league stats
tipsbladet

1991 births
Living people
Danish men's footballers
Danish people of Ukrainian descent
Danish expatriate men's footballers
Expatriate footballers in Scotland
FC Midtjylland players
Celtic F.C. players
Danish Superliga players
Association football defenders
Denmark under-21 international footballers
Denmark international footballers
Scottish Professional Football League players
Danish twins
Danish expatriate sportspeople in Scotland
People from Viborg Municipality
Sportspeople from the Central Denmark Region